Justine Gail Tinio (born December 3, 1995) is a Filipina foil fencer. She is the 2015 Southeast Asian Games individual foil silver medalist, as well as a three-time team medalist in the team foil and team épée events at the 2019 and 2021 Southeast Asian Games. Tinio is also the champion of the women's individual foil event at the 2014 Philippine National Games.

As of June 2015, Tinio is a college student at the University of the East. As a representative of her college, she was named the MVP for women's fencing at the fencing championship of UAAP Season 77.

References

1995 births
Living people
Filipino female foil fencers
University Athletic Association of the Philippines players
Southeast Asian Games medalists in fencing
Southeast Asian Games silver medalists for the Philippines
Southeast Asian Games bronze medalists for the Philippines
Fencers at the 2018 Asian Games
Competitors at the 2015 Southeast Asian Games
Asian Games competitors for the Philippines
Competitors at the 2019 Southeast Asian Games
Competitors at the 2021 Southeast Asian Games